Hillary "Fordy" Echesa (born 9 September 1981 in Kenya) is a Kenyan international footballer, currently playing for Chemelil Sugar in the Tusker Premier League.

References

External links
 
 
 Hillary Echesa Odada at liga-indonesia.co.id

1981 births
Living people
Kenyan footballers
Kenya international footballers
Kenyan expatriate footballers
Young Africans S.C. players
Rayon Sports F.C. players
Simba S.C. players
Tusker F.C. players
Deltras F.C. players
Liga 1 (Indonesia) players
Expatriate footballers in Tanzania
Expatriate footballers in Rwanda
Expatriate footballers in Malaysia
Expatriate footballers in Indonesia
Kenyan expatriate sportspeople in Tanzania
Kenyan expatriate sportspeople in Rwanda
Kenyan expatriate sportspeople in Malaysia
Kenyan expatriate sportspeople in Indonesia
Sofapaka F.C. players
Chemelil Sugar F.C. players
Association football midfielders
Mumias Sugar F.C. players
Tanzanian Premier League players
People from Nakuru